Santa Rosa de Río Primero is a town in the province of Córdoba, Argentina. It lies in the center-northeast of the province, by the Primero River (also known as Suquía), about 75 km from the provincial capital Córdoba.

Notable residents
Jose Gabriel del Rosario Brochero was born in Santa Rosa de Rio Primero.

References
 

Populated places in Córdoba Province, Argentina